Cody Lane (born January 3, 1996) is an American professional stock car racing driver. He currently competes part-time in the NASCAR Xfinity Series, driving the No. 27 Chevrolet Camaro for the Cody Lane Racing. He has also competed in the ARCA Racing Series and NASCAR Camping World Truck Series.

Racing career
A native of Missouri, Lane began his career in racing at age 4, racing in go-karts; he moved up to late model racing at the age of 14. Racing in central Tennessee in his mid-teens, after his family moved to Florida he became a regular competitor at Citrus County Speedway and Showtime Speedway Lane competed in the Florida All Stars Tour in 2010, finishing tenth in series points; by the merits of that he received the series' Rookie of the Year award. Lane's 2011 and 2012 racing seasons were the subject of a documentary, Blue Collar Racing, filmed by James Sherry.

Lane made his debut in major-league stock car racing in ARCA Racing Series competition on March 9, 2013, competing in the ARCA Mobile 200 at Mobile International Speedway. Driving for a team owned by his family, and a car originally driven by Carl Edwards in 2009, he started 18th in the event, finishing 25th after an accident in which he launched his car outside the track in turn 3, landing in a grove of trees; during practice for the event, he had skidded outside the track in Turn 4. Lane finished 27th in his second race of the year at Toledo Speedway; he then posted his best finish of the year, fourteenth, at Winchester Speedway in June. Lane raced with money from his parents until he turned eighteen; after that, it was all sponsorship money. 

In 2015, Lane and his own team attempted a NASCAR Camping World Truck Series race at Bristol Motor Speedway; however, the attempt ended when the team failed to qualify.

After taking a hiatus from major racing since 2015, Lane returned to the ARCA series for the 2017 Lucas Oil Complete Engine Treatment 200 at Daytona. The car Lane was driving was built by a group of 75 high school dropouts in the Pasco County, Florida area. After arriving late to the track, the Dream Team had a limited amount of track time and was the fastest car that did not qualify for the race. Lane and crew soldiered on to the next race, again missing inspection and starting from the back. He attempted one more race in 2017 at Talladega Superspeedway, getting collected in a large wreck and finishing nineteenth. 

Lane attempted to make his Xfinity Series' debut in 2018 NASCAR Xfinity Series season at Richmond Raceway but he crashed in his first lap in opening practice so he was forced to withdraw the event.

Personal life 
A native of Missouri, his family moved to Florida due to family issues; Lane attended Fivay High School.

Motorsports career results

NASCAR
(key) (Bold – Pole position awarded by qualifying time. Italics – Pole position earned by points standings or practice time. * – Most laps led.)

Xfinity Series

Camping World Truck Series

 Season still in progress
 Ineligible for series points

ARCA Racing Series
(key) (Bold – Pole position awarded by qualifying time. Italics – Pole position earned by points standings or practice time. * – Most laps led.)

References

External links
 

Living people
1996 births
People from Hudson, Florida
Racing drivers from Florida
ARCA Menards Series drivers
NASCAR drivers
Place of birth missing (living people)